The 2012 Farmers Classic, presented by Mercedes-Benz, was a men's tennis tournament played on outdoor hard courts in Los Angeles. It was the 86th edition of the Los Angeles Open, and was part of the Emirates Airline US Open Series of the 2012 ATP World Tour. It took place at the Los Angeles Tennis Center on the campus of UCLA, from July 23 through July 29, 2012, with total player compensation in excess of $1 million. The events were televised by ESPN2 and the Tennis Channel. During the early rounds, Rhythm & Blues group "The Spinners", and "Sax and the City" performed at the Classic.  Sam Querrey from California, fellow American James Blake, France's Nicolas Mahut and Belgium's Xavier Malisse, the tournament's reigning doubles champion, were participants of this year's tournaments.

Defending champion, Querrey, who grew up in nearby Thousand Oaks, defeated Ričardas Berankis for his third Los Angeles title in four years on July 29, 2012. Xavier Malisse teamed up with Ruben Bemelmans this year to win the doubles championship. Querrey would also join fellow Americans, Andre Agassi and Jimmy Connors as the only three men to win 3 or more titles in the Open Era. The 2012 tournament marked the last time an ATP World Tour tournament would be held in Los Angeles.

Singles main-draw entrants

Singles seeds

 1 Seedings based on the rankings of July 16, 2012

Other entrants
The following players received wildcards into the singles main draw:
  Brian Baker
  Steve Johnson
  Jack Sock

The following players received entry from the qualifying draw:
  Ričardas Berankis
  Chris Guccione
  Bradley Klahn
  Nicolas Meister

Withdrawals
  Malek Jaziri
  Lukáš Lacko

Doubles main-draw entrants

Seeds

 Rankings are as of July 16, 2012

Other entrants
The following pairs received wildcards into the doubles main draw:
  Marcos Giron /  Nicolas Meister 
  Steve Johnson /  Sam Querrey
The following pair received entry as alternates:
  Chris Guccione /  Marinko Matosevic

Withdrawals
  Ryan Sweeting (back injury)

Retirements
  Michael Russell (back injury)

Finals

Singles

 Sam Querrey defeated  Ričardas Berankis, 6–0, 6–2

Doubles

 Ruben Bemelmans /  Xavier Malisse defeated  Jamie Delgado /  Ken Skupski, 7–6(7–5), 4–6, [10–7]

References

External links
Official website

2012 ATP World Tour
2012
2012 in sports in California
July 2012 sports events in the United States